Mahabubnagar district is a district in the Indian state of Telangana. Mahabubnagar is the district headquarters which is popularly known as Palamoor. The district shares boundaries with Narayanapet, Vikarabad, Rangareddy, Nagarkurnool, Wanaparthy and Jogulamba Gadwal districts. The district was formed during the period of the 6th Nizam of Hyderabad State – Nawab Mir Mahbub Ali Khan and hence named after him.

Etymology 
Mahabubnagar was formerly known as Palamoor, meaning "land of milk" due to its milk production. The name was changed to Mahabubnagar on 4 December 1890, in honour of Mir Mahbub Ali Khan Asaf Jah VI, the Nizam of Hyderabad (1869–1911 AD).

History 
The area that forms current Mahabubnagar district has held historic significance. It was under Janapada rule by 6th century BCE, and later was Maurya territory. The region was at the core of the Satavahana dynasty from 221 BCE to 218 CE, and also a large part of the Chalukya dynasty from the 5th to the 11th century CE. The region was later part of the Kingdom of Golkonda (c. 1364 – 1512), with its capital city Golkonda located near Hyderabad.

In 1518 it came under control of the Qutb Shahi dynasty, which reigned until 1687. The region was then a part of Hyderabad State, ruled by the Asaf Jahi Dynasty, from 1724 to 1948.

Geography 

The Krishna river flows through the district, as well as the Tungabhadra. They merge at Sangameswaram.

Demographics 
The official language of the district is Telugu and the second official language is Urdu. Scheduled Castes and Scheduled Tribes make up 14.1% and 11.5% of the population respectively.

Jain temple 
The oldest terracotta style Jain temple is in Alvanpalli village of Mahabubnagar district. This temple was built between 7th and 8th century.
This temple is one of the two such structures in India other built during Gupta period is located at Bhitargaon under Kanpur district, Uttar Pradesh. This temple was built using bricks made of burnt clay. The large bricks of the temple were plaster using the limestone. The principal deity of the temple was Mahavira. The temple was around 18th century, since no efforts were being made to conserve it the rare structure the sculptures of Mahavira, Parsvanatha and few other historical importance had been moved to a local museum in Pillalamarri and some to the State Museum in the city.

Economy 
In 2006 the Indian government named Mahabubnagar one of the country's 250 most backward districts (out of 640 total). It is one of the 9 districts in Telangana currently receiving funds from the Backward Regions Grant Fund Programme (BRGF).

Administrative divisions 
The district has one revenue divisions of Mahabubnagar. These are sub-divided into 16 mandals.  Ravi Gugulothu IAS is the present collector of the District.

Notable people 

 V. Srinivas Goud – politician
 Suravaram Pratapareddy – social historian
 Burgula Ramakrishna Rao – former Chief Minister of Hyderabad State
 Devarakonda Vittal Rao – politician
 Jaipal Reddy – politician
 Nagam Janardhan Reddy – politician
 Venkatarama Reddy - kotwal
 Goreti Venkanna – singer
 B. Venkateshwarlu – writer and journalist

Education 
Mahabubnagar district falls under the jurisdiction of Osmania University and Palamuru University. The district has many government and private medical college, junior, undergraduate and graduate colleges.

See also 
List of districts in Telangana
Gaddampally

References

External links 

 Official site

 
1948 establishments in India
Districts of Telangana